Otaqvar District is a district (bakhsh) in Langarud County, Gilan Province, Iran. At the 2006 census, its population was 15,010, in 4,088 families.  The District has one city: Otaqvar. The District has two rural districts (dehestan): Lat Leyl Rural District and Otaqvar Rural District.

References 

Langarud County
Districts of Gilan Province